Bosshard is a surname. Notable people with the name include:

Hansjörg Bosshard (born 1940), Swiss sprinter
Kobi Bosshard (born 1939), Swiss-born New Zealand jeweller
Otto Bosshard (1876–1943), American lawyer and politician
Rudolf Bosshard (1890–1980), Swiss rower
Walter Bosshard (photojournalist) (1892–1975), Swiss photographer and reporter
Walter Bosshard (footballer) (1921–1984), Swiss footballer

See also
Bosshardt